Summer Darkness is an alternative music festival in the Netherlands which was held annually from 2003 to 2013, around the second weekend in August in the city of Utrecht. Over the years its popularity has grown considerably.

Organisation
Summer Darkness is organised similar to Germany's Wave-Gotik-Treffen, albeit on a much smaller scale. Acts perform in various clubs throughout the city of Utrecht. The main stages are Tivoli Oudegracht, Tivoli de Helling and EKKO. There are also individual performances at the Domkerk and Leeuwenbergh church. Side events include a market, city tours and exhibitions by LARP groups.
The festival was a joint venture by Cybercase, Tivoli (Utrecht), EKKO and Mojo until EKKO made the decision in 2009 to quit.

There have been some minor events held under the banner of Summer Darkness. For instance since 2007 there have been several "Summer Darkness - Winter Edition" events.

In 2014 the festival will be taking a sabbatical from the usual summer edition, traditionally held in the last weekend of July.
In 2015 it was announced the festival would no longer be organised, as explained on the festival website.

See also

List of gothic festivals
List of electronic music festivals

References

External links
Official website

Music festivals established in 2003
Goth festivals
Electronic music festivals in the Netherlands